Yingzhou or Ying Prefecture (郢州) was a zhou (prefecture) in imperial China in modern Hubei, China, seated in modern Zhongxiang. It existed (intermittently) from 551 until 1278.

Geography
The administrative region of Yingzhou in the Tang dynasty falls within modern Jingmen in central Hubei. It probably includes parts of modern: 
 Zhongxiang
 Jingshan County

References
 

Prefectures of Western Wei
Prefectures of Northern Zhou
Prefectures of the Sui dynasty
Prefectures of the Tang dynasty
Prefectures of Later Liang (Five Dynasties)
Prefectures of Later Tang
Prefectures of Later Jin (Five Dynasties)
Prefectures of Later Han (Five Dynasties)
Prefectures of Later Zhou
Prefectures of the Song dynasty
Prefectures of the Yuan dynasty
Former prefectures in Hubei